Stolen Kosovo is a 2008 Czech language documentary by director Václav Dvořák (b. 1948), about events during and following the Kosovo War.

Synopsis

The documentary describes the situation in Kosovo, first in a short overview of the history of the area, followed by the 1990s conflicts and bombing of Serbia by NATO forces in 1999 and ending with the situation after the Kosovo War. The documentary focuses on 1990s in the time of Slobodan Milošević's rule as well as on numerous interviews of Albanian separatists and Serbian civilians .

Broadcasting
Although the Czech Television (Česká televize) had been one of the sponsors of the documentary, it delayed broadcasting it several times, claiming the documentary was "unbalanced" and marked with "pro-Serbian bias", and so "the tone of the documentary could cause negative emotions" Václav Dvořák, the director, responded that the same could be said for "Holocaust documentaries, where the Nazi Germany 'side' and 'views' were also appropriately ignored".

The documentary producer, Aleš Bednář, additionally stated that it wasn't ruled out that some viewers could feel it was "unbalanced", but only because they had been "lopsidedly informed about Balkan conflicts through years, above all by television, but by other media as well."

Its first broadcasting, scheduled for 17 March 2008, on the 4th anniversary of the ethnic clashes in Kosovo in 2004, was postponed until April, and it was eventually broadcast with a follow-up show analyzing the Kosovo conflict from the point of view of the Kosovo Albanians. The creators of the documentary published it on YouTube, where it is still available (as of June 2015).

On 17 February 2009, the 1st anniversary since the 2008 Kosovo declaration of independence, Radio Television of Serbia aired Stolen Kosovo at 21:00 CET on its RTS1 channel, preceded by an interview with the director.

Notes and references
Notes:

References:

External links
 

Documentary films about terrorism
Czech documentary films
Serbian–Albanian conflict
Persecution of Serbs
2008 documentary films
2008 films
Works about the Kosovo War
Cultural depictions of Slobodan Milošević